Beaton J. Abbott (1903 – March 8, 1992) was an educator, magistrate and politician in Newfoundland. He represented Gander from 1956 to 1966 and Bonavista North from 1966 to 1971 in the Newfoundland House of Assembly.

He was born in Musgrave Harbour and was educated there, at St. John's Methodist College and at La Salle. Abbott taught school for thirteen years and then served as a magistrate at Twillingate, Grand Bank and Grand Falls over a 21-year period. He was a member of the United Church General Council from 1952 to 1956 and was president of the Newfoundland Bible Society from 1959 to 1968.

He was first elected to the Newfoundland assembly in 1956. He served in the Newfoundland cabinet as Minister of Public Welfare, Minister of Municipal Affairs and Supply, Minister of Supply and Minister of Municipal Affairs and Housing. Abbott resigned from cabinet in 1968. He died in 1992.

References 

1903 births
1992 deaths
Liberal Party of Newfoundland and Labrador MHAs
Members of the Executive Council of Newfoundland and Labrador
La Salle Extension University alumni
Canadian schoolteachers